Trevor Robert Harding (born 1 November 1986 in Subiaco, Western Australia) is a former motorcycle speedway rider from Australia.

Career
He rode for the King's Lynn Stars in the British Premier League.

In 2006, he helped King's Lynn Stars win the triple (Premier League, Premier League Knock-out Cup and Premier Trophy).

In January 2008, he suffered serious injuries in the Ron Johnson Memorial meeting, in Australia and was due to return to King's Lynn but the plans did not materialise.

References

1986 births
Living people
Australian speedway riders
Sportspeople from Perth, Western Australia
King's Lynn Stars riders
Sheffield Tigers riders